Wiejkówko  (German Klein Weckow) is a village in the administrative district of Gmina Wolin, within Kamień County, West Pomeranian Voivodeship, in northwestern Poland.

References

Villages in Kamień County